The Czecho Slovakian Association Hall, also known as Preucil School of Music, is a building in Iowa City, Iowa that was built in 1900, as a community center and meeting place for the Czechoslovakian Protective Society (C.S.P.S.), which later became the Czecho Slovakian Association.  The C.S.P.S., like other fraternal organizations, began by offering a kind of insurance.  The local chapter was organized in Iowa City in 1882.  It served the Czech community that was concentrated in the north and northeast areas of the city.  Like other C.S.P.S. halls, it hosted social, cultural, and educational activities, and this one also hosted gymnastics.

An assembly room, with a high vaulted ceiling and tall arched windows, occupies the second floor. As of 1975, the room had a stage on one end and a balcony on the other, and was being renovated to serve as a concert hall.

It was listed on the National Register of Historic Places in 1976.

See also
C.S.P.S. Hall (Cedar Rapids, Iowa), also NRHP-listed, built in 1891

References

Buildings and structures in Iowa City, Iowa
National Register of Historic Places in Iowa City, Iowa
Clubhouses on the National Register of Historic Places in Iowa
Czech-Slovak Protective Society
Czech-American culture in Iowa
Cultural infrastructure completed in 1900